Paphiopedilum adductum is a species of plant in the family Orchidaceae. It is endemic to Mindanao Island of the Philippines. Its natural habitat is subtropical or tropical moist lowland forests. It is threatened by habitat loss and overcollection.

Sources 

Flora of Mindanao
Endemic orchids of the Philippines
adductum
Critically endangered plants
Taxonomy articles created by Polbot